Lodeña is one of 24 parishes (administrative divisions) in Piloña, a municipality within the province and autonomous community of Asturias, in northern Spain.

The population is 55 (INE 2011).

Villages and hamlets
 Barbon 
 Faidiello 
 Llana Coya (La Llanecoya)
 Lodeña 
 Migoya 
 El Palacio (El Palaciu) 
 Santa Leocadia (Santa Llocaya) 
 Sopeña 
 La Torre 
 Valdeladuerna

References

Parishes in Piloña